First Choice may refer to:

 First Choice (band), an American vocal trio, active 1971–1984
 First Choice Emergency Room, a healthcare company based in Flower Mound, Texas
 First Choice Liquor, an Australian retailer
 First Choice (travel firm), travel firm owned by TUI Group
 First Choice Airways, its former in-house airline
 First Choice Haircutters, a Canadian hairdressing company
 Crave, a pay TV service in Canada, known simply as "First Choice" 1983–84 and 1989–93
 First Choice Superchannel, a service jointly operated with Superchannel (Movie Central) from 1984 to 1989
 Pfs:First Choice, a 1980s word processing program